At the 1906 Summer Olympics in Athens (often referred to as the "Intercalated Games"), an unofficial football event was held. Only four teams competed, with three of them being clubs from Greece and the Ottoman Empire. Medal tables list the gold medalist as Denmark, with the silver and bronze medalists as Turkey.

Denmark were awarded the gold medal after the Athens team forfeited the final at half-time. The Athens team were subsequently invited to play off in a three-team tournament to decide second place, but refused and were promptly ejected from the competition, leaving Smyrna and Thessaloniki (both cities in the Ottoman Empire at the time) to play off for the silver and bronze medals. 

The Thessaloniki team composition was Greek from the group of "Friends of the Arts" (Omilos Philomuson, later Iraklis Thessaloniki F.C.). The Smyrna (former name of Turkish city İzmir), a team consisted of English, French and Armenian players, was also part of the competition. The Danish team was a selection of players from the Copenhagen Football Association. As this competition was not an official Olympic football tournament, no national football teams participated.

All the matches were played at Podilatodromio, which was originally a velodrome.

Venue 

All the matches were hosted at "Neo Phaliron Velodrome" (or "Podilatodromio"), originally a velodrome and sports arena in the Neo Faliro District of Piraeus. This venue had been used for the track cycling events at the Athens 1896 Olympics also held in Athens.

This venue was then demolished to built the Karaiskakis Stadium, a football stadium with capacity for 32,000.

Squads 

 : Viggo Andersen, Peder Pedersen, Charles von Buchwald, Parmo Ferslev, Stefan Rasmussen, Aage Andersen, Oscar Nielsen, Carl Pedersen, Holger Frederiksen, August Lindgren, Henry Rambusch, Hjalmar Herup
 Smyrna (Ottoman Empire): Edwin Charnaud, Zareh Kouyoumdjian, Edouard Giraud, Jacques Giraud, Henri Joly, Percy de la Fontaine, Donald Whittal, Albert Whittal, Godfrey Whittal, Harold Whittal, Edward Whittal.
 Thessaloniki (Formed by Greek players): Georgios Vaporis, Nikolaos Pindos, Antonios Tegos, Nikolaos Pentzikis, Ioannis Kyrou, Georgios Sotiriadis, Vasilios Zarkadis, Dimitrios Mikhitsopoulos, Antonios Karagionidis, Ioannis Abbot, Ioannis Saridakis.
 Athens (Greece): Panagiotis Vrionis, Nikolaos Dekavalas, Georgios Merkouris, Konstantinos Botasis, Grigorios Vrionis, Panagiotis Botasis, Georgios Gerontakis, Giorgos Kalafatis, Theodoros Nikolaidis, Konstantinos Siriotis, A. Georgiadis.

Results

Semi-finals

Final 

Note: Athens refused to continue after half-time; therefore, the match was abandoned and Denmark were awarded the gold medal.

Second place match

Tournament ranking

References

 
1906
1906 Intercalated Games events
1906
Ottoman Thessalonica
Ottoman İzmir/Smyrna
Inter
inter
inter
Inter